John Dunning may refer to:

 John Dunning (businessman) (born 1934), British businessman, founder of Westmorland Motorway Services
 John Dunning (detective fiction author) (born 1942), American writer of detective fiction
 John Dunning (true crime author) (1918–1990), true crime author
 John Dunning (snooker player) (1927–2009), English professional snooker player
 John Harry Dunning (1927–2009), British economist
 John Dunning (film editor) (1916–1991), American film editor
 John Dunning (film producer) (1927–2011), Canadian film producer
 John R. Dunning (1907–1975), American physicist
 Jack Dunning (John Angus Dunning, 1903–1971), New Zealand Test cricketer
 John Dunning, 1st Baron Ashburton (1731–1783), English lawyer and politician
 John Dunning (volleyball) (born 1950), American volleyball coach